The Pugilist is a 2021 album by The BBB Featuring Bernie Dresel.  The recording is the third release from The BBB Featuring Bernie Dresel.

Background

Production of The Pugilist was during the COVID 19 coronavirus pandemic, during most of 2021.  Unlike the two earlier BBB releases, recorded with the full band in concert or at Capitol Studios, The Pugilist was recorded without the band ever playing together at the same time.  The tracks were recorded separately during the first months of 2021, instrument by instrument from remote locations (self recording).  Bernie Dresel’s drums were recorded first, then he overdubbed secondary drum set parts (heard in the rear loudspeakers in surround and Auro-3D); the other instrumental tracks were added to eventually create an edited and mixed master.  The others performers recorded to a click track, used to synchronize their tracks to each other. A 'click track' provides the musician with precise beats per minute (bpm) for each tune recorded; the range was from 70 bpm to 280 bpm.

Dresel's drum kit was recorded with 15 microphones, all of the recording were captured at 96-kHz/24-bit resolution.  After the tracks were completely recorded, a preliminary mix was enhanced with reverberation and 'room sound', which served as a reference point for the final mixing. Patrick Lemmens loaded all of the individual tracks into Avig Pro Tools and set the mix prior to Dresel and Gary Reber arriving at Galaxy Studios in Belgium. The final mix was achieved by working closely with Wilfried Van Baelen at Galaxy.  The album is recorded and mastered in Auro-3D, The Pugilist is also offered on Blu-ray Disc (BD).   Auro-3D audio formatting was achieved by adding natural 3D sound reflection of Galaxy Hall in Mol.

Promotion

The Pugilist album was both released and premiered on Wednesday, November 17, 2021 at Herb Alpert's Vibrato Grill & Jazz in the Bel Air, Los Angeles area of Southern California: this performance was also Dresel's 60th ‘Birthday Bash.’  Groov Marketing and consulting is the primary outlet handling the promotion on radio and digital platforms.

Reception

"...doesn't let up through the end of an earnest and aggressive session that sets ablaze four well-known standards and ten original compositions including one apiece by Miles Davis, Michael Jackson and Frank Zappa."
Jack Bowers, All About Jazz

"This disc shows (sic)...a heavy beat, emphatic licks and impeccable playing."
Ross Boissoneau, Local Spins Best of 2021

Charts

Track listing
 "The Pugilist" (James McMillen)  – 3:49
 "Running and Jumping" (Andrew Neu)  – 5:05
 "Lulu’s Back In Town" (Al Dubin, Harry Warren} – 3:58
 "Don't Stop 'Til You Get Enough" (Michael Jackson) – 4:23
 "You'd Be So Nice to Come Home To" (Cole Porter) – 5:46
 "World Premiere" (James McMillen) – 4:50
 "Positive for the Blues" (Nan Schwartz) – 5:28
 "10or 2oon" (Brian Williams) – 3:05
 "Rico’s Rowdy Rhumba" (James McMillen) – 4:30
 "I Got Rhythm" (George Gershwin, Ira Gershwin) – 3:41
 "La Vie En Rose" (Louiguy, Edith Piaf} – 3:12
 "All Blues" (Miles Davis) – 4:51
 "What Could Possibly Go Wrong?" (Andrew Neu)  – 5:42
 "Zomby Woof" (Frank Zappa)  – 5:00

Personnel 
Bernie Dresel - drums 
 The BBB:
 Brian Scanlon - alto saxophone, soprano saxophone (lead)
 Kirsten Edkins - alto saxophone
 Rob Lockart, Tom Luer - tenor saxophone
 Brian Williams - baritone saxophone
 Dave Richards, Jamie Hovorka, Anthony Bonsera - trumpet (lead)
 Carl Saunders, Jeff Bunnell - trumpet
 Alan Kaplan - trombone (lead)
 Ryan Dragon, James McMillen  - trombone
 Juliane Gralle - bass trombone
 Andrew Synowiec - guitars and electric bass
 Djordje Stijepovic - Upright Slap Bass
 Carl Saunders - vocal (7)
 Anthony Bonsera - vocal and synth piano (14)

Jack Cooper (3), James McMillen (4, 9, 10), Dave Richards (5), Tim Simonec (11), Jeff Bunnell (12), Anthony Bonsera (14) - arrangers

Production
Wilfried Van Baelen - Executive producer
Bernie Dresel, Gary Reber - Producer
Patrick Lemmens - Recording engineer
Patrick Lemmens, Wilfried Van Baelen - Mixing engineers
Tom Van Achte - Mastering engineer 

Recorded at various locations in Los Angeles and compiled by Patrick Lemmens 
Mixed at Galaxy Studios, Mol, Belgium

External links

See also

Bernie Dresel
Galaxy Studios
Carl Saunders
 Nan Schwartz
Jack Cooper

References

2021 albums
Big band albums